Bomma Blockbuster is a 2022 Indian Telugu-language Romantic action Drama film written and directed by Raj Virat and produced by Praveen Pagadala, Bose Babu Nidimolu, Anand Reddy Maddi and Manohar Reddy Eeda for Vijayibhava Arts. The film features Nandu  and Rashmi Gautam in lead roles with Kireeti Damaraju and Raghu Kunche in pivotal roles. Songs and background score are composed by Prashanth R Vihari.

Plot 
Pothuraja was a fisherman and a villager. He is very fond of director Puri Jagannadh. Pothuraju wrote a story based on his life events and his desire is to make the film with Puri Jagannadh. One day Pothuraj's father is killed by unknown persons. Later, the movie tells how Poturaju fulfills his dream and takes revenge on those who killed his father.

Cast 
 Nandu  as Pothuraju
 Rashmi Gautam 
 Kireeti Damaraju
 Raghu Kunche

Soundtrack 

Music composed by Prashanth R Vihari

Release
The film was released on 4 November 2022.

Critical reception 
The film received 2 stars out of five in a review by The Times of India and 2.25 stars out of five by 123telugu.com

References

https://youtube.com/v7G6MCJIIyc

External links